The Oceania Area Championships in Athletics records are the best marks set by athletes who are representing one of the Oceania Athletics Association's member states during the correspondent athletics event which began in a former competition format in 1990. From 2012 onwards the competition has its present name.

Men
Key:

Women
Key:

Heptathlon disciplines

Mixed

References
General
Oceania Championships records 23 July 2019 updated
Specific

External links

Championships
records
Oceanian Championships